Pól is a masculine given name in both the Irish and Faroese languages.

Persons with the name
Pól Brennan, (born 1956), Irish, musician.
Pól Callaghan, Northern Irish, politician.
Pól Ó Foighil, (1928–2005), Irish, politician and activist for Irish-speaking.
Pól Jóhannus Justinussen (born 1989), Faroese footballer.
Pól Thorsteinsson, (born 1973), Faroese, a footballer.

See also
Paul (name)

Irish-language masculine given names
Faroese masculine given names